Gorny is a rural locality (a settlement) in Gornensky Selsoviet of Zeysky District, Amur Oblast, Russia. The population was 1366 as of 2018. There are 18 streets.

Geography 
Gorny is located on the north bank of the Zeya Reservoir, 261 km northeast of Zeya (the district's administrative centre) by road. Verkhnezeysk is the nearest rural locality.

References 

Rural localities in Zeysky District